Edward "Teddy" Bishop (10 October 1864 – 24 February 1919) was a Welsh international rugby union player who played club rugby for Swansea and was capped once for Wales.

Rugby career
During the 1882/83 season, Bishop was part of the Llandovery College team that played against fellow Welsh college team Christ College, Brecon. By 1888, Bishop had switched to first class rugby club Swansea, and that year he was part of the team that faced the first international touring team, the New Zealand Natives. Bishop was suffering with damaged ribs, but played regardless showing bravery throughout the match. At one point Bishop missed the goal from a dropkick by a matter of inches. Swansea eventually lost the game by a goal and two tries to nil.

In 1889 Bishop was selected for his one and only appearance for Wales. As part of the 1889 Home Nations Championship, Bishop was chosen to play against Scotland at Raeburn Place under the captaincy of Frank Hill. Wales lost the match and Bishop never represented his country again.

International matches played
Wales
  1889

Bibliography

References

1864 births
1919 deaths
Wales international rugby union players
Rugby union centres
Swansea RFC players
People educated at Llandovery College
Rugby union players from Swansea